Stories About Lenin is a 1957 Soviet drama film directed by Sergei Yutkevich.

Plot 
The story tells about the events connected with Lenin in 1917 (when he was supposed to be in Finland) and in 1923–1924, when his life was approaching the end.

Cast 
 Maksim Shtraukh as Vladimir Lenin
 Maria Pastukhova as Nadezhda Krupskaya
 Anna Lisyanskaya as Maria Ilyinichna Ulyanova
 Oleg Yefremov as Felix Dzerzhinsky
 Aleksandr Kutepov as Yakov Sverdlov
 Vsevolod Sanayev as Nikolai Yemelyanov  
 Gennadi Yukhtin as Fyodor Mukhin 
Lyubov Studneva as Yefrosinya Ivanovna
Boris Bibikov as general Polovtsev 
Pavel Sukhanov as Pavel Nikolayevich 
 Lev Polyakov as lieutenant Baryshev
 Aleksandr Belyavsky as Kolya 
 Ivan Voronov as Grigory Belov

Awards
 XI Karlovy Vary International Film Festival for Best Actor (Maksim Shtraukh)	
 All-Union Film Festival — honorary diploma (Sergei Yutkevich, Maksim Shtraukh)

References

External links 
 
 Stories About Lenin on Kinopoisk

1957 films
1950s Russian-language films
Soviet drama films
Films about Vladimir Lenin
Films directed by Sergei Yutkevich
Russian Civil War films
Mosfilm films
Films set in 1917
Films set in 1923
Films set in 1924
Russian Revolution films
Soviet revolutionary propaganda films
1957 drama films